Paweł Pietryja (born 2 June 1992) is a Polish badminton player who affiliate with UKS Plesbad Pszczyna. He competed at the 2015 European Games in Baku, Azerbaijan. In 2016, he won two titles at the Hellas Open in the men's doubles event partnered with Miłosz Bochat and in the mixed doubles event with Aneta Wojtkowska.

Achievements

BWF International Challenge/Series (8 titles, 10 runners-up) 
Men's doubles

Mixed doubles

  BWF International Challenge tournament
  BWF International Series tournament
  BWF Future Series tournament

References

External links 
 

1992 births
Living people
People from Pszczyna
Polish male badminton players
Badminton players at the 2015 European Games
European Games competitors for Poland